The 1961 Boston Red Sox season was the 61st season in the franchise's Major League Baseball history. The Red Sox finished sixth in the American League (AL) with a record of 76 wins and 86 losses, 33 games behind the AL and World Series champion New York Yankees.

Regular season 
Future Hall of Famer Carl Yastrzemski made his major league debut on Opening Day, April 11. He was considered the heir apparent to Ted Williams, who had retired at the end of 1960.

On June 30, Wilbur Wood made his major league baseball debut with the Red Sox. In a game against the Cleveland Indians, Wood pitched 4 innings, allowed 3 hits, and 2 earned runs. He had 3 strikeouts and allowed 1 walk.

On October 1, in a game against the New York Yankees, Red Sox pitcher Tracy Stallard gave up Roger Maris' 61st home run of the season, breaking Babe Ruth's record for most home runs in a season.

Season standings

Record vs. opponents

Notable transactions 
 May 17, 1961: Joe Ginsberg was signed as a free agent by the Red Sox.
 June 26, 1961: Rip Repulski was released by the Red Sox.

Opening Day lineup

Roster

Player stats

Batting

Starters by position 
Note: Pos = Position; G = Games played; AB = At bats; H = Hits; Avg. = Batting average; HR = Home runs; RBI = Runs batted in

Other batters 
Note: G = Games played; AB = At bats; H = Hits; Avg. = Batting average; HR = Home runs; RBI = Runs batted in

Pitching

Starting pitchers 
Note: G = Games pitched; IP = Innings pitched; W = Wins; L = Losses; ERA = Earned run average; SO = Strikeouts

Other pitchers 
Note: G = Games pitched; IP = Innings pitched; W = Wins; L = Losses; ERA = Earned run average; SO = Strikeouts

Relief pitchers 
Note: G = Games pitched; W = Wins; L = Losses; SV = Saves; ERA = Earned run average; SO = Strikeouts

Farm system 

LEAGUE CHAMPIONS: Olean

Source:

References

External links
1961 Boston Red Sox team page at Baseball Reference
1961 Boston Red Sox season at baseball-almanac.com

 

Boston Red Sox seasons
Boston Red Sox
Boston Red Sox
1960s in Boston